Rice is a city in Navarro County, Texas, United States. The population was 923 at the 2010 census.

Geography

Rice is located at  (32.234563, –96.494670).

Climate

The climate in this area is characterized by hot, humid summers and generally mild to cool winters.  According to the Köppen Climate Classification system, Rice has a humid subtropical climate, abbreviated "Cfa" on climate maps.

Demographics

2020 census

As of the 2020 United States census, there were 1,203 people, 326 households, and 297 families residing in the city.

2000 census
As of the census of 2000, there were 798 people, 260 households, and 215 families residing in the city. The population density was 294.9 people per square mile (113.7/km). There were 371 housing units at an average density of 137.1/sq mi (52.9/km). The racial makeup of the city was 76.32% White, 9.77% African American, 0.25% Native American, 12.53% from other races, and 1.13% from two or more races. Hispanic or Latino of any race were 17.54% of the population.

There were 260 households, out of which 48.8% had children under the age of 18 living with them, 61.2% were married couples living together, 14.6% had a female householder with no husband present, and 17.3% were non-families. 11.9% of all households were made up of individuals, and 4.2% had someone living alone who was 65 years of age or older. The average household size was 3.07 and the average family size was 3.33.

In the city, the population was spread out, with 33.8% under the age of 18, 8.5% from 18 to 24, 35.0% from 25 to 44, 15.8% from 45 to 64, and 6.9% who were 65 years of age or older. The median age was 30 years. For every 100 females, there were 91.4 males. For every 100 females age 18 and over, there were 91.3 males.

The median income for a household in the city was $31,875, and the median income for a family was $33,375. Males had a median income of $28,375 versus $20,250 for females. The per capita income for the city was $11,616. About 17.1% of families and 15.6% of the population were below the poverty line, including 7.0% of those under age 18 and 36.0% of those age 65 or over.

History

The city's namesake is William Marsh Rice, who donated the land for a community school.  He is the same person who founded Rice University. Its unofficial motto is "The city so nice, they named it Rice."

Education
The City of Rice is served by the Rice Independent School District.

References

External links
 City of Rice – unofficial site

Cities in Navarro County, Texas
Cities in Texas